Agromyza albipennis is a species of fly in the family Agromyzidae. It is found in the Palearctic. Wings milky. Squamae with white borders and vestiture. Last segment of vein 5 (Cu A1 equal to twice the length of  the precedent.- Long. : 2–3 mm. The larvae mines Poaceae

References

External links
Images representing  Agromyza albipennis at BOLD

Agromyzidae
Insects described in 1830
Muscomorph flies of Europe